Baisha is a town in Xiaochang County, Hubei, China. , it has one residential community and 40 villages under its administration.

References

Township-level divisions of Hubei
Xiaochang County